Joe Sukhdev Edwin Ellis-Grewal (born 18 February 1992) is an English former first-class cricketer.

Ellis-Grewal was born at Walthamstow in February 1992. He was educated at Beal High School, before going up to the University of Leeds. While studying at Leeds, he made two appearances in first-class cricket for Leeds/Bradford MCCU in 2015, against Sussex and Yorkshire. He scored 44 runs in these matches, with a high score of 42, while with his slow left-arm orthodox bowling, he took 6 wickets with best figures of 4 for 118. In addition to playing first-class cricket, he also played minor counties cricket for Suffolk in 2014, making a single appearance in the Minor Counties Championship and five appearances in the MCCA Knockout Trophy.

References

External links

1992 births
Living people
People from Walthamstow
Alumni of the University of Leeds
English cricketers
Suffolk cricketers
Leeds/Bradford MCCU cricketers